Josep Maria Rañé (born Barcelona, Spain 15 June 1954) is a Spanish politician.

Life overview
He studied higher Industrial Engineering. He belongs to the Union of Consumers of Catalonia. 

He is affiliated to the Unión General de Trabajadores (Unión General de Trabajadores (UGT, General Workers' Union) of Catalonia since 1976, he has been the General Secretary (1978–1979) of its Local Union of Sant Feliu de Llobregat, Secretary of union policy (1979–1981), General Secretary (1981–1990) of the Baix Llobregat, Secretary of institutional policy of the National Secretariat of the UGT of Catalonia (1990–1997) and  Defender of members' rights of the UGT (1997-2001]).

Political background
Josep Maria Rañé has been an active member of the Socialists' Party of Catalonia-Spanish Socialist Workers' Party (PSC-PSOE) since 1984. Member of the Executive for the Baix Llobregat, he also has been responsible for the secretariat of social policy on the National Executive. Between 1983 and 1984 he became Town Councillor for Sant Just Desvern for Youth and Work. Since 1999 he is Town Councillor for Sant Feliu de Llobregat, where he is the fourth tinent d'alcalde (deputy mayor) and spokesperson for the Socialist Municipal Group. 

He was a member of the Executive Committee of the Council of Work, of the General Council of the Catalan Health Institute (of the Catalan Health Council), of the Management Council of the Catalan Health Service, of the Plenary of the Institute of Work Studies of the Universitat de Barcelona, of the Economic and Social Council of Barcelona City Council and of the General Council of the National Institute of Social Security.

References

1954 births
Living people
Politicians from Barcelona
Socialists' Party of Catalonia politicians
Labour ministers of Catalonia